The following is the list of mammals which have been taxonomically described in the 21st century.

Living higher taxa

Living genera

Living subgenera

Living species

Living subspecies

See also 
 List of mammals described in the 2000s

Mammals
described in the 21st century